Exacum travancoricum is one of the rare and threatened plants of western Ghats. It comes under family Gentianaceae. Moderately to much branched usually laxly cushion-like herb with elliptic, somewhat succulent leaves and usually solitary terminal pale blue to blue flowers. Endemic to Southern Western Ghats at 950-1800m (Ponmudi, Agasthyamala and Tinnevelly hills). Flowers during July - November.

Leaves dense, fleshy, 1-1.5 x 0.6-0.8 cm, elliptic-ovate, obtuse to round at apex, attenuate at base; margins thin; midrib prominent.

References

External links
 Exacum travancoricum Bedd in KeW Science

travancoricum